General Sir James Shaw Kennedy,  (13 October 1788 – 30 May 1865) was a British soldier and military writer.

Personal background
Shaw Kennedy was the son of Captain John Shaw, a former captain in the 76th Highlanders, of Dalton, Kirkcudbrightshire. He was educated at Ayr Academy. He was commissioned into the 43rd (Monmouthshire) Light Infantry in 1805 joining the regiment at Hythe, Kent where it was training under Sir John Moore. He first saw service in the Copenhagen Expedition of 1807 as a lieutenant, and under Sir David Baird took part in the Corunna Campaign. In the retreat from Corunna, led by Sir John Moore, Shaw and the 43rd fought with the rearguard to the army. On his return to England he suffered from a severe fever from which he never fully recovered. In May 1809, Shaw returned to the Peninsula with the 43rd and took part in the 250-mile march from Lisbon to Talavera where he became adjutant of his now famous regiment at the Battle of Talavera.

Military career
As Robert Craufurd's aide-de-camp during 1809 and 1810, Shaw was on the staff of the Light Division at the Coa and the Agueda, and, with William Campbell, prepared and edited the Standing Orders of the Light Division (printed in Home's Précis of Modern Tactics, pp. 257–277). He was wounded at Almeida in 1810, but rejoined Craufurd at the end of 1811 and was with his chief at the siege of Ciudad Rodrigo in January 1812. At the great assault of 19 January, Shaw carried his general, mortally wounded, from the crest of the glacis and later conveyed Wellington's summons to surrender to the French governor. At Badajoz, now once more with the 43rd, he displayed, at the lesser breach, a gallantry which furnished his brother officer William Napier with the theme of one of his most glorious descriptive passages.

At the siege and the Battle of Salamanca, in the retreat from Burgos, Shaw, still a subaltern, distinguished himself and in July 1812, was promoted to captain. At the end of the year, he had to return to England due to ill health. In April 1813, Shaw joined the senior department of the Royal Military College, Sandhurst. He returned to active service, and at the Battle of Waterloo on 18 June 1815, he was assistant quartermaster-general with the Third Division of Charles Alten. The Third Division, during the late afternoon of 18 June, had to defend its position against repeated French cavalry charges and Shaw was struck in the side and out of action for a period. During the battle, one of his horses was killed and another wounded under him. Shaw, by his reconnoitring skill and tactical judgment, was of the greatest assistance to Alten and to Wellington, who promoted him brevet major in July, and brevet lieutenant-colonel in January, 1819.

During the occupation of France by the allied army, Shaw was commandant of Calais from 1815 to 1818, and on his return to England, was employed as a staff officer in the north. In this capacity, he was called upon to deal with the Manchester riots of 1819.

Manchester
Shaw was put on half pay 25 March 1817, and was not called back to active service until 1826 when he was appointed assistant adjutant-general in Belfast, but within less than a year he transferred to Manchester where, over the next nine years, he dealt with several outbreaks of civil disorder which had their origins in the widespread dissatisfaction with working conditions.

Royal Irish Constabulary
Shaw in 1829 declined Sir Robert Peel's offer of the position of first commissioner of the newly formed Metropolitan Police. He was inspector-general of the Royal Irish Constabulary (RIC) from 1836 to 1838 during which time he raised and organized a force of 8000 men. Afterwards, Shaw led a retired country life for ten years.

Liverpool and ill health
In 1848, during the Chartist movements, Shaw Kennedy as he was then known (see family below) was called upon to command at Liverpool, and soon afterwards was offered successively a command in Ireland and the governorship of Mauritius. Ill-health compelled him to decline these. A little later he briefly took up an offer of the Scottish command, but was again forced to retire due to ill health. In 1852, Sir William Napier, referring to Shaw Kennedy, said that, "He is, perhaps, with the exception of Lord Seaton, the very ablest officer in the service".

Later years
Shaw Kennedy was promoted to lieutenant-general in June 1854, and in August of the same year, he became colonel of the 47th Foot. He was promoted to full general in August 1862. Shaw Kennedy was appointed C.B. in July 1838, and K.C.B. in 1863. He also held the military general service medal, often known as the Peninsular silver medal, with three clasps and the Waterloo medal.

Shaw Kennedy died in Bath, Somerset on 30 May 1865, following a long-standing liver complaint.

Bibliography
In 1859, at the time of the Orsini case, Shaw Kennedy wrote an essay on The Defence of Great Britain and Ireland and in 1860 he wrote a brief autobiography. In 1863 he wrote his famous Notes on Waterloo, appended to which was a Plan for the defence of Canada. All were published in 1865. He was the first historian of the Battle of Waterloo to divide the battle into five distinct but interrelated parts: a framework of the battle which was later to be used by other historians.

Family
Shaw married Mary Primrose Kennedy of Kirkmichael at Ayr in 1820, with whom he later had one son and two daughters. In 1834, on succeeding, in right of his wife, to the estate of Kirkmichael, he added Kennedy to his surname.

They had three children:
Wilhelmina Shaw, who died young;
Henrietta Shaw Kennedy, who married Primrose W. Kennedy of Drumellan;
John Shaw Kennedy (d 1905), laird of Kirkmichael

See also
Shaw River (Victoria), a river in Victoria, Australia named by Thomas Mitchell in 1836.

Notes

References

Attribution
 Endnotes:
Autobiographical notice in Notes on Waterloo,
The regimental history of the 43rd and Napier, passim.

Further reading
 The Oxfordshire and Buckinghamshire Light Infantry, Philip Booth (1971)
 The Story of the Oxfordshire and Buckinghamshire Light Infantry (The old 43rd and 52nd Regiments), Sir Henry Newbolt (1915)
 Waterloo, Andrew Roberts (2005).

1788 births
1865 deaths
British Army generals
British Army personnel of the Napoleonic Wars
Knights Commander of the Order of the Bath
Inspectors-General of the Royal Irish Constabulary
47th Regiment of Foot officers
43rd Regiment of Foot officers
Recipients of the Waterloo Medal
People educated at Ayr Academy
People from Dumfries and Galloway
British military writers